In mathematics, Hilbert's fourteenth problem, that is, number 14 of Hilbert's problems proposed in 1900, asks whether certain algebras are finitely generated.

The setting is as follows: Assume that k is a field and let K be a subfield of the field of rational functions in n variables,

k(x1, ..., xn ) over k.

Consider now the k-algebra R defined as the intersection

Hilbert conjectured that all such algebras are finitely generated over k.

Some results were obtained confirming Hilbert's conjecture in special cases and for certain classes of rings (in particular the conjecture was proved unconditionally for n = 1 and n = 2 by Zariski in 1954). Then in 1959 Masayoshi Nagata found a counterexample to Hilbert's conjecture. The counterexample of Nagata is a suitably constructed ring of invariants for the action of a linear algebraic group.

History 

The problem originally arose in algebraic invariant theory. Here the ring R is given as a (suitably defined) ring of polynomial invariants of a linear algebraic group over a field k acting algebraically on a polynomial ring k[x1, ..., xn] (or more generally, on a finitely generated algebra defined over a field). In this situation the field K is the field of rational functions (quotients of polynomials) in the variables xi which are invariant under the given action of the algebraic group, the ring R is the ring of polynomials which are invariant under the action. A classical example in nineteenth century was the extensive study (in particular by Cayley, Sylvester, Clebsch, Paul Gordan and also Hilbert) of invariants of binary forms in two variables with the natural action of the special linear group SL2(k) on it. Hilbert himself proved the finite generation of invariant rings in the case of the field of complex numbers for some classical semi-simple Lie groups (in particular the general linear group over the complex numbers) and specific linear actions on polynomial rings, i.e. actions coming  from finite-dimensional representations of the Lie-group. This finiteness result was later extended by Hermann Weyl to the class of all semi-simple Lie-groups. A major ingredient in Hilbert's proof is the Hilbert basis theorem applied to the ideal inside the polynomial ring generated by the invariants.

Zariski's formulation 

Zariski's formulation of Hilbert's fourteenth problem asks whether, for a quasi-affine algebraic variety X over a field k, possibly assuming X normal or smooth, the ring of regular functions on X is finitely generated over k.

Zariski's formulation was shown to be equivalent to the original problem, for X normal. (See also: Zariski's finiteness theorem.)

Éfendiev F.F. (Fuad Efendi) provided symmetric algorithm generating basis of invariants of n-ary forms of degree r.

Nagata's counterexample

 gave the following counterexample to Hilbert's problem. The field k is a field containing 48 elements a1i, ...,a16i,  for i=1, 2, 3 that are algebraically independent over the prime field. The ring R is the polynomial ring k[x1,...,x16, t1,...,t16] in 32 variables. The vector space V is a 13-dimensional vector space over k consisting of all vectors (b1,...,b16) in k16 orthogonal to each of the three vectors (a1i, ...,a16i) for i=1, 2, 3. The vector space V is a 13-dimensional commutative unipotent algebraic group under addition, and its elements act on R by fixing all elements tj and taking xj to xj + bjtj.  Then the ring of elements of R invariant under the action of the group V is not a finitely generated k-algebra.

Several authors have reduced the sizes of the group and the vector space in Nagata's example. For example,  showed that over any field there is an action of the sum G of three copies of the additive group on k18 whose ring of invariants is not finitely generated.

See also 
Locally nilpotent derivation

References 
Bibliography

 O. Zariski, Interpretations algebrico-geometriques du quatorzieme probleme de Hilbert, Bulletin des Sciences Mathematiques 78 (1954), pp. 155–168.
Footnotes

14
Invariant theory